Nepenthes deaniana (after Dean C. Worcester) is a tropical pitcher plant endemic to the Philippines, where it grows at an altitude of 1180–1296 m above sea level. The species is known only from the summit region of Thumb Peak, a relatively small, ultramafic mountain in Puerto Princesa Province, Palawan.

Nepenthes deaniana has no known natural hybrids. No forms or varieties have been described.

In his Carnivorous Plant Database, taxonomist Jan Schlauer treats N. gantungensis, N. leonardoi and N. mira as heterotypic synonyms of N. deaniana.

Adolph Daniel Edward Elmer recorded a plant from Mount Pulgar (now known as Thumb Peak) matching the description of N. deaniana. He made mention of this discovery in the April 20, 1912 issue of Leaflets of Philippine Botany, in his formal description of N. graciliflora:

Recently the writer [Elmer] observed a large sterile species on mount Pulgar of Palawan. Some of its pitchers were a foot long and six inches thick!

References

Further reading

 Cheek, M.R. & M.H.P. Jebb 1999. Nepenthes (Nepenthaceae) in Palawan, Philippines. Kew Bulletin 54(4): 887–895. 
 Co, L. & W. Suarez 2012. Nepenthaceae. Co's Digital Flora of the Philippines.
 McPherson, S. 2007. The Type Form of Nepenthes deaniana. Carnivorous Plants UK, July 19, 2007. 
 McPherson, S.R. & V.B. Amoroso 2011. Field Guide to the Pitcher Plants of the Philippines. Redfern Natural History Productions, Poole.
  McPherson, S. & T. Gronemeyer 2008. Die Nepenthesarten der Philippinen: eine Fotodokumentation. Das Taublatt 60: 34–78.
 McPherson, S., G. Bourke, J. Cervancia, M. Jaunzems, E. Gironella, A. Robinson & A. Fleischmann 2011. Nepenthes leonardoi (Nepenthaceae), a new pitcher plant species from Palawan, Philippines. Carniflora Australis 8(1): 4–19.
 McPherson, S.R. 2011. Comparison of the highland Palaweño Nepenthes. In: New Nepenthes: Volume One. Redfern Natural History Productions, Poole. pp. 364–381.
 Mey, F.S. 2013. Nepenthes deaniana in cultivation. Strange Fruits: A Garden's Chronicle, July 30, 2013.
 Miles, J. 2012. Discovering a lost world of rat-eating plants in the Philippines. Friday, October 9, 2012.
 Schlauer, J. 1995. Re: Nepenthes. Carnivorous Plant Mailing List, October 5, 1995.
 Schlauer, J. 2000. Literature reviews. Carnivorous Plant Newsletter 29(2): 53.
 Lecture on Plant Hunting – Royal Horticultural Society 6th May 2014. [video] Redfern Natural History Productions.

External links

Photographs of N. deaniana at the Carnivorous Plant Photofinder

Carnivorous plants of Asia
deaniana
Endemic flora of the Philippines
Flora of Palawan
Plants described in 1908